"Stranger in Possum Meadows" is the fifty-second episode (the seventeenth episode of the third season (1988–89) of the television series The Twilight Zone. In this episode, a boy befriends a mysterious stranger who has strange powers and is curious about the creatures of Earth.

Plot
Danny Wilkins and his mother live in a mobile home in a rural community. While playing in the creek in Possum Meadows, Danny meets a man in a grey outfit, who says his name is Scout. He is unfamiliar with such things as frogs, and Danny has to explain to him. When Danny tells his mom about Scout, she is furious with him for trusting a stranger and warns him to stay away from Scout. Outside, Scout studies birds and fish. He points at a deer, which disappears.

That evening Scout arrives for dinner. Mrs. Wilkins starts to send him away, but abruptly changes her mind and invites him inside. Their dog growls at Scout but he puts his hand out, at which the dog whimpers and cowers. During dinner, they converse about Scout's family and how Mrs. Wilkins must work, so Danny is alone for a few hours when he gets home from school. Scout tells them he is from a large industrial firm looking for a place to locate and he stays in a motor home near Possum Meadows. Danny insists on loaning Scout his flashlight when he leaves. Mrs. Wilkins tells Danny that she wants him not to go see Scout after school.

The next day, Danny comes home to find his dog gone. Scout shows up with the flashlight and asks Danny to come with him, claiming Mrs. Wilkins and the dog are at his house and they are going to have dinner together. Danny is suspicious but goes along anyway. Mrs. Wilkins arrives home, finding Danny gone and the flashlight on the porch. She finds Scout at the creek and demands to know what he has done with Danny, but he says Danny was not home when he returned the flashlight. He proposes to look for Danny in the woods while she looks along the creek.

Inside Scout's motor home are the dog, the deer, and Danny, all frozen. Scout, in an alien language, reports to his home world that he is prepared to return with his specimens. Scout asks about the well-being of his family and says he misses them. Mrs. Wilkins searches in the dark for Danny. She comes upon a spaceship which flies into space. She begins crying, believing Danny might be aboard. However, she finds him lying in the grass, having been returned by Scout out of respect for the familial bond between him and his mother.

External links
 

1989 American television episodes
The Twilight Zone (1985 TV series season 3) episodes
Television episodes about alien visitations

fr:L'Étranger dans le bois